Charles August Sulzer (February 24, 1879 – April 15, 1919) was a delegate to the United States House of Representatives from the Territory of Alaska from 1917 to 1919.

Life and career
Sulzer was born on February 24, 1879, in Roselle, New Jersey in Union County, the son of Lydia (Jelleme), who was Frisian, and Thomas Sulzer, a German immigrant. He attended the public schools, Pingry School in Elizabeth, New Jersey, Berkeley Academy in New York City, and the United States Military Academy at West Point, New York. During the Spanish–American War, he served with the Fourth Regiment, New Jersey Volunteer Infantry. Charles Sulzer moved to Alaska in 1902 and engaged in mining.

He was a member of the Alaska Territorial Senate in 1914. He presented his credentials as a Democratic delegate-elect to the Sixty-fifth Congress and served from March 4, 1917, to January 7, 1919, when he was succeeded by James Wickersham, who had contested his election. He later presented his credentials as a Delegate-elect to the Sixty-sixth Congress and served from March 4, 1919, until his death on April 15, 1919, before the convening of Congress. According to published accounts on April 16, Sulzer took ill in Sulzer and died aboard a boat while en route to a hospital in Ketchikan.  He was interred in Evergreen Cemetery in Hillside, New Jersey. His brother, William Sulzer, was also a congressman and a governor of New York.

See also

 List of United States Congress members who died in office (1900-49)

Sources

External links
 
 Charles Sulzer at 100 Years of Alaska's Legislature
 

1879 births
1919 deaths
Alaska Democrats
Businesspeople from Alaska
Delegates to the United States House of Representatives from Alaska Territory
Democratic Party members of the United States House of Representatives from Alaska
Members of the Alaska Territorial Legislature
Military personnel from New Jersey
20th-century American politicians
People from Roselle, New Jersey
Pingry School alumni
United States Military Academy alumni
Burials at Evergreen Cemetery (Hillside, New Jersey)
American people of German descent
American people of Frisian descent
19th-century American politicians
19th-century American businesspeople
Members of the United States House of Representatives removed by contest